Ryszard Seruga (born March 31, 1953 in Nowy Sącz) is a former Polish slalom canoeist who competed in the 1970s and the 1980s.

He won four medals in the C-2 team event at the ICF Canoe Slalom World Championships with a gold (1979), a silver (1981) and two bronzes (1975, 1977).

Seruga also finished fifth in the C-2 event at the 1972 Summer Olympics in Munich.

References

1953 births
Canoeists at the 1972 Summer Olympics
Living people
Olympic canoeists of Poland
Polish male canoeists
Sportspeople from Nowy Sącz
Medalists at the ICF Canoe Slalom World Championships